The João Lopes Bank is a seamount situated  northwest of the community of Anjos, on the Portuguese island  of Santa Maria in the Azores.

Geography
This undersea geological formation consists of a rocky outcrops, an unsheltered zone at the extreme northwest of the island of Santa Maria, that is susceptible to strong currents.

At the deeper areas the geology is primarily composed of basalt rock, interspersed by sand and large boulders of varying dimensions.

Biome
The area is dotted with a rich biodiversity of varying aquatic species; the bank is populated sea floor and mid-oceanic schools of Azores chromis (Chromis limbata), Blacktail comber (Serranus atricauda), Guinean puffer (Sphoeroides marmoratus), Mediterranean rainbow wrasse (Coris julis), Ornate wrasse (Thalassoma pavo), Salema porgy (Sarpa salpa) and Mediterranean parrotfish (Sparisoma cretense). At  depths are frequently visible Needlefish (Belonidae), o lírios, the large Atlantic goliath grouper (Epinephelus itajara), schools of Giant oceanic manta ray (Manta birostris), Dolphins and White-Tip Sharks, known in the Azores as Marracho.

See also
 Hydrothermal vents and seamounts of the Azores

References

Geography of the Azores
Vila do Porto